The 50-mile race walk is a racewalking event.  The event is competed as a road race.  See Kennedy march for the 50-mile walk started a fitness challenge.

Athletes must always keep in contact with the ground and the supporting leg must remain straight until the raised leg passes it.  50 miles is 80.47 kilometers.

U.S. records

In 1966, Israeli Shaul Ladany broke United States record in the 50-mile walk, which had stood since 1878 and was at the time the oldest U.S. track record.

World bests
The men's world best for the 50-mile race walk is held by Ladany, through his race of 7:23:50 in 1972 in New Jersey, shattering the world mark that had stood since 1935.

Notes

References

Racewalking distances